Restrepia cuprea, the copper-colored restrepia, is a species of orchid endemic to Colombia.

References

External links 

cuprea
Endemic orchids of Colombia